Josphat Bett Kipkoech (born 12 June 1990) is a Kenyan long distance runner.

He won a gold medal in the 10000 metres at the 2008 World Junior Championships in Athletics, setting a new championship record of 27:30.85 in the process. He is the middle of three brothers who are all athletes, Emmanuel Bett and David Kiprotich Bett.

Personal records

References

External links

1990 births
Living people
Kenyan male long-distance runners
Athletes (track and field) at the 2014 Commonwealth Games
Athletes (track and field) at the 2018 Commonwealth Games
Commonwealth Games medallists in athletics
Commonwealth Games silver medallists for Kenya
Medallists at the 2014 Commonwealth Games